Line 17 (Gold) is an under construction monorail project for the São Paulo Metro. The line will have 14 stations, beginning at the São Paulo-Morumbi station and ending at the Jabaquara station, with a branch to Congonhas station, connected to the São Paulo/Congonhas Airport. It will have integration with Line 1-Blue, Line 4-Yellow, and Line 5-Lilac as well as CPTM Line 9-Emerald. The line was originally one of the transportation projects supporting the 2014 FIFA World Cup. However, delays and contract disputes have pushed the completion date from the original 2013 full opening date to 2024. Once completed, the line will be the first in the system to have a branch.

The second phase, expected to have a demand of 100,000 passengers per day, will begin operations in 2015. The two sections will connect at the future Brooklin Paulista station, forming a "Y". However delays and heritage preservation issues prevented the line from starting construction, leading it to be shelved in 2011. The line was revived soon after with a proposed first phase expanded to connecting Morumbi station and the Congonhas-São Paulo Airport with a daily demand forecast of 43,000 passengers and projected opening in the first half of 2014. The second phase will extend the line west to São Paulo–Morumbi Station increasing the projected ridership for the line to 252,000.

On 2 June 2011, São Paulo Metro awarded the Monotrilho Integracao, a consortium consisting of a Malaysian rail company Scomi Rail, Brazil's second largest construction company Andrade Gutierrez, CR Almeida and Montagens e Projetos Especiais a R$1.4bn turnkey contract to build Line 17. The consortium will be responsible for design, supply, installation and commissioning of the Sutra straddle monorail, including 24 Scomi SUTRA three-car trains to be provided by Scomi. The line will be operated as CBTC using Thales SelTrac technology.

On 9 June 2014, a concrete support beam collapsed during construction which killed one worker and injuring two others. Completion was scheduled for the start of the World Cup but construction was delayed due to issues with environmental approvals. As a result, the line was delayed until the second half of 2015. Construction stopped October 2015 due to a contract dispute with construction only to be resumed in June 2016. This delay postponed the opening date of the first phase to 2018. Further delays in the construction has meant that the first phase of the line was further postponed from 2018 to 2019.

With the financial trouble of Scomi leading to non-performance in manufacturing the monorail rolling stock, the contract was terminated in 2019. After a short rebidding process it was announced that BYD will manufacture the rolling stock using their "SkyRail" platform. On 14 January 2020, a new contract was created, and completion was postponed to 2021 or 2022.

In November 2020, after months of legal battles, the Metropolitan Company signed a contract with Coesa Engenharia, owned by Brazilian company OAS, for the conclusion of general construction works. The annual report of the São Paulo Metropolitan Company estimates the opening of the line on 30 April 2023. Before leaving the state government, Governor João Doria estimated the opening to January 2024.

Stations

See also 

 List of monorail systems
 Line 15 (São Paulo Metro)

References 

São Paulo Metro
Monorails
Sao 17
2024 in rail transport